Norwegian Sky is a Sun-class cruise ship owned and operated by Norwegian Cruise Line. She was originally ordered by Costa Cruises as Costa Olympia from the Bremer Vulkan shipyard in Germany, but she was completed in 1999 by the Lloyd Werft shipyard in Bremerhaven, Germany for the Norwegian Cruise Line under the name Norwegian Sky. Between 2004 and 2008, she sailed as Pride of Aloha for NCL America.

Concept and construction

The ship that eventually became known as Norwegian Sky was originally ordered in December 1993 by Costa Cruises from the Bremer Vulkan shipyard as their yard number 108 in Bremen, Germany as the second in a pair of sister ships. The first sister, Costa Victoria, was delivered on July 10, 1996. Construction of the second sister, Costa Olympia, had started several months before, but by July 1996, Bremer Vulkan was experiencing severe financial difficulties, and work on Costa Olympia was suspended when only 35% of the ship was completed. On October 6, 1996, the incomplete hull was launched, floated out of drydock and subsequently laid up.

Costa Cruises decided not to purchase the unfinished ship, and Costa Olympia remained laid up at Bremer Vulkan until December 1997, when Norwegian Cruise Line (NCL) purchased her. Costa Olympia was redesigned as Norwegian Sky by Tillberg Design (who had also been responsible for her original planned design as Costa Olympia). On March 8, 1998, the ship was towed to Lloyd Werft in Bremerhaven, Germany where her construction was completed. In fact, the ship retained the yard number of 108 under special circumstances. In 1998, NCL ordered two additional ships of Norwegian Sky design. The first of these was delivered in 2001 as Norwegian Sun while the order for the second one was cancelled. Norwegian Sky underwent her sea trials on July 17, 1999, and was delivered to NCL on July 28, 1999.

Service history
Norwegian Sky entered service and made her maiden voyage for Norwegian Cruise Line on August 9, 1999, with a cruise from Dover, United Kingdom to Norway. The ship's crew acted as her godparents at her christening. After a period of financial difficulties, she was the first new ship to enter service with NCL in six years.

After four years of service, NCL announced she would be moved to its new NCL America division as Pride of Aloha in October 2004. Originally she was planned to be preceded by the purpose-built Pride of America in NCL America service, but a rogue storm damaged Pride of America during construction at Lloyd Werft and Pride of Aloha had to be rushed into service instead. In May 2004, Norwegian Sky entered drydock in San Francisco, re-emerging as Pride of Aloha on July 4, 2004. Pride of Aloha was re-christened by Mrs. Margaret Awamura Inouye, the wife of Hawaiian senator Daniel K. Inouye.

Being a U.S.-flagged vessel, Pride of Aloha required a crew of U.S. citizens.  This made for a difficult launch as there was no established labor market to tap into. The first few months of sailings were plagued by poor service, crewmembers quitting and walking off the ship while in port, and an enormous number of customer complaints.  NCL initiated a new and aggressive training program to better prepare newly hired employees for life aboard a cruise vessel. Subsequently the training for all employees took place at the Paul Hall Center for Maritime Training and Education, a Maritime School in Piney Point, Maryland. Passenger satisfaction improved substantially since the introduction of the new training program.

On February 11, 2008, NCL announced that Pride of Aloha would be withdrawn from the Hawaiian market as of May 5, 2008. Initially it was reported that she would be transferred to the fleet of Star Cruises. During April 2008, Lloyd's List reported that NCL was looking to sell her to the Spain-based Royal Caribbean Cruises Ltd. subsidiary Pullmantur Cruises instead, but Pullmantur Cruises later withdrew their offer. In May 2008 NCL reported that instead of transferring to Star Cruises, the ship would return to Norwegian Cruise Line and be re-flagged to the Bahamas while reverting to her original name Norwegian Sky with the first sailing July 14, 2008.

In January 2009, Norwegian Sky was sold to Ample Avenue, a subsidiary of Genting Hong Kong, and chartered back to NCL on a bareboat charter. In July 2010, the charter agreement was extended. The new agreement included options for NCL to extend the charter period further and an option for NCL to purchase the ship during the charter period. On June 1, 2012, NCL announced the signing of a memorandum of agreement to exercise its option to purchase Norwegian Sky.  The purchase price was approximately $260 million, with financing being provided by the seller.

Hurricane Irma caused cruises to be cancelled; afterwards Norwegian Sky evacuated almost 2,000 travelers from St. Thomas and took them to Miami.

In June 2019, it was announced that, following the travel ban preventing U.S. cruise ships from visiting Cuba, Norwegian Sky would no longer be offering their "open bar" service and would instead transition to the traditional way for charging for onboard drinks.

Design 
As originally planned, Costa Olympia would have had an exterior and interior design identical to Costa Victoria. Following the acquisition by Norwegian Cruise Line, she was radically redesigned. Design changes included two decks of balcony cabins (opposed to no balcony cabins in the original plans), three additional restaurants, entirely altered decor and moving the bridge down by one deck to accommodate an observation lounge/spa complex on the topmost deck. Both the original and revised plans were the work of Tillberg Design.

Initially Norwegian Sky utilized a standard dining program with set meal seating times for passengers. One year after she entered service, NCL introduced their "Freestyle Cruising" (a 'dine where you want, when you want') program.  As a result, the ship had to be retrofitted with additional restaurants.

When the ship was refitted for service as Pride of Aloha, a Hawaiian theme was adapted for the decorations of all public areas and cabins. At the same time, she received hull art consisting of colorful Hawaiian leis.

Prior to being rechristened, the Pride of Aloha was not allowed to have a casino given the fact that it was mainly in US waters. Instead of a casino, the ship had the Kumu Cultural Center. This focused on three main themes - Everyday life in Ancient Hawai`i, the Hawaiian Kingdom and Contemporary Hawai'i.

When the Pride of Aloha was rechristened back to Norwegian Sky, the casino was reinstated but she retained her livery.

Ports of call
Norwegian Sky is currently sailing three- and four-night cruises from Miami to the Bahamas with stops at Grand Bahama, Great Stirrup Cay, Freeport, and Nassau.  The ship introduced a new concept starting in January 2016 and ending in June 2019 where alcohol was included in the cost, with an upcharge only for premium brands.

Cuba 

Norwegian Sky was one of the first U.S.-based ships to visit Cuba.

Accidents and incidents
While doing her inaugural cruise along the Eastern coast of the United States and Canada up to Québec City, Norwegian Sky temporarily ran aground in the Saguenay River on September 24, 1999. On its return to the mouth of the Saguenay, at about 11:30 local time, whales were observed in the St. Lawrence River. To prolong the whale-watching activity, the vessel was turned around but ran aground on the Bancs de l'île Rouge (Rouge Island Banks) before completing its maneuver. The vessel's stern made bottom contact with the shoal. The vessel slowed and the stern came to rest on the Bancs de l'île Rouge. At 12:06, the vessel was aground, listing 5.2º to port. As the vessel was unstable on the reef, the master requested assistance from the Canadian Coast Guard for a preventive evacuation of all passengers plus some crew members. The Marine Rescue Centre of Québec tasked different resources including whale-watching tour boats and the two provincial ferries normally crossing the Saguenay River. However, at the very last moment, with the assistance of a small Search and Rescue cutter and the high tide, Norwegian Sky was able to free herself from the reef and proceeded to deeper waters. The vessel sustained substantial damage, but pollution was deemed minor. No injuries resulted from this occurrence. The vessel returned to Québec City for major repairs in a local dry-dock taking over a month. As a result, three cruises had to be cancelled.

In May 2001, the autopilot on Norwegian Sky failed and caused it to make a jarring turn and then list, sending plates and glasses crashing and injuring more than 78 people. The malfunction, near the mouth of the Strait of Juan de Fuca, appeared to be the result of a computer error. Two serious injuries were the result of a video game machine falling on one passenger and another passenger suffering a broken pelvis when he was washed out of a pool due to the severe list.

After the  fish tender Arctic Sun struck a rock and sank in Clarence Strait in the Alexander Archipelago in Southeast Alaska on July 26, 2002, and the three people on board abandoned ship in a  skiff, Norwegian Sky rescued them from the skiff and transported them to Ketchikan, Alaska.

On Saturday, April 18, 2009, at 3:30 AM, a 39-year-old man went overboard in the Bahamas. A search party consisting of three cruise ships and two U.S. Coast Guard helicopters searched for the man for twelve hours before calling off the search. It is unclear whether the man committed suicide.

On December 4, 2015, the ship had to be evacuated while docked in Miami, Florida after a passenger boarded the ship without properly scanning his boarding pass. The man cleared the pier-side security checkpoint, and then bolted past the security checkpoint on the ship. Officers from Miami-Dade police and Customs and Border Protection performed a sweep of the ship and it was cleared to sail several hours later.

Notes

References

Notes

Bibliography

External links
 Official website
 Norwegian Sky Photo Gallery

Ships of Norwegian Cruise Line
Ships built in Bremen (state)
1996 ships